Sardar Raja Arts and Science College, is a general degree college located in Vadakkangulam, Tirunelveli district, Tamil Nadu. The college is affiliated with Manonmaniam Sundaranar University. This college offers different courses in arts, commerce and science.

Departments

Science
Mathematics
Microbiology
Computer Science

Arts and Commerce
English
Commerce

Accreditation
The college is  recognized by the University Grants Commission (UGC).

References

External links
http://arts.rajas.edu/home.html

Colleges affiliated to Manonmaniam Sundaranar University
Universities and colleges in Tirunelveli district